Petit is an EP by Japanese singer-songwriter Ua, released on October 21, 1995. Like its lead single, Petit also failed to chart on the Oricon charts. The EP was re-issued on September 22, 2005.

Track listing

References

External links 

1995 debut EPs
Japanese-language EPs
Ua (singer) albums